Airman, by Eoin Colfer, is a best-selling historical adventure novel set in the 19th century. It was released in the UK, Ireland and USA in January 2008. The novel was shortlisted for the 2009 Carnegie Medal.

Colfer was inspired to write the book after a frightening skydiving experience. He combined this with his childhood observation that the Saltee Islands would make an excellent prison.

Most of the story is fictional. The Saltee Islands have been uninhabited since the 19th century and all of the main characters in the story are fictional.

Plot
The book begins with the Paris World's Fair of 1878, which Declan Broekhart and his wife, Catherine, are attending. They are there mainly to take a ride in a new hot air balloon. While they are in the air, along with one Victor Vigny, the balloon is shot at by men from the ground. During the forced landing, Conor Broekhart is born, flying over Paris.

It is 1887. Conor and his family live on the sovereign Saltee Islands, off the Irish coast, which are ruled by King Nicholas Trudeau. Nicholas is a progressive leader who is helping the islands adapt to the industrialized world.

When a dangerous fire traps young Conor and his friend Isabella (the king's daughter) on top of a tower's roof, he saves both their lives by making a makeshift glider to fly them to safety. He is obsessed with building a "flying machine".  Unfortunately, the head of the island's guards, Marshall Hugo Bonvilain, conspires to overthrow Nicholas and seize control of the Saltees. His goal is to turn the islands into a market for the diamonds mined by inmates on the prison island, Little Saltee. Despite Conor's attempt to intervene, Nicholas and Victor are killed by Marshall Bonvilain. Marshall Bonvilain takes control of the islands and tells his subjects that Victor conspired to kill King Nicholas and Conor tried to save the King, but died in the effort. Conor, however, does not know this, and instead thinks that Bonivilain has told his family that he was involved in the plot to kill the King. Conor is thrown into jail on Little Saltee, under the alias Conor Finn. His family and friends believe he is dead.

Conor's cellmate, Linus Wynter, an American musician and spy, helps Conor adapt to prison life. Before long, Conor begins to make deals with a guard named Arthur Billtoe and gangsters called the Battering Rams. Linus soon mysteriously disappears, and Conor believes him dead, as he was told Linus was released, and "release" on Little Saltee comes only with death.

Two years pass and Conor is 16. He persuades Billtoe to plant gardens for inmates to work in. Conor and Otto Malarkey, a Battering Ram, smuggle seven bags of diamonds and hide them in the gardens. Meanwhile, Conor tricks Billtoe into getting him bed sheets and other materials using an invention and a few good ideas. Unbeknownst to Billtoe, Conor is using these materials to plan a grand escape during the coronation of Isabella, now old enough to become Queen of the Saltees. The coronation and the arrival of Queen Victoria are approaching and Conor constructs a parachute. He persuades Billtoe to suggest that during the coronation, several hot air balloons are filled with fireworks and released from Little Saltee so that the famous Saltee sharpshooters can shoot the balloons for a grand fireworks display. During the coronation ceremony, Conor escapes from his cell and plants himself in one of the fireworks balloons. When his balloon is shot down, Conor activates his parachute and crash-lands in Queen Victoria's yacht.

A stowaway on Queen Victoria's private yacht, he makes it safely to Kilmore, the Irish village overlooking the Saltees. There he discovers Linus Wynter, still alive. The pair finds a tower full of aviation equipment that was once Victor Vigny's laboratory. Conor constructs a hang-glider and adopts the persona of the Airman, a flying French swordsman. By night, Conor makes flights to Little Saltee, terrorizing the guards and digging up his bags of smuggled diamonds. Conor's goal is to use the diamonds to start a new life in the United States of America. Conor's plans are interrupted when Bonvilain finds Conor's tower and harms Linus. Linus learns that Bonvilain intends to overthrow the monarchy again by poisoning Isabella and her greatest supporters, Conor's mother and father. Conor hears this information and decides he must save his family and the queen. He constructs the flying machine he has always dreamed of, a one-man aeroplane powered by an internal-combustion engine, and flies to Bonvilain's tower. There, he is reunited with Isabella and his family. Conor, Isabella, and Conor's father, Declan, engage Bonvilain and his guards in a sword fight. They are victorious. Bonvilain tries escaping on Conor's hang-glider, but is pierced through the heart by a ceremonial sword used by Declan and his dead body, still attached to the glider, glides towards the sea submerging him forever.

One month later, Queen Isabella is seeking reform. She has reduced taxes and intends to free the prisoners and hand Little Saltee over to a professional mining firm. Conor is ready to leave for Glasgow University to study for a science degree and kisses Isabella. The Forlorn Tower is in the good hands of "Uncle" (a street boy Conor befriended) and two of his pack. Linus is to live with Conor as well.

Film adaptation
A film adaptation for the book utilizing motion-capture was announced in September 2008. It was set to be directed by Gil Kenan and produced by Robert Zemeckis through his joint venture with Walt Disney Pictures, ImageMovers Digital. In October 2009, Ann Peacock signed on as screenwriter. No further development has been reported.

Release details
2008, USA, Hyperion Books for Children , January 2008, Hardback
January 2008 source Colfer Confidential

References

2008 Irish novels
Novels by Eoin Colfer
2000s adventure novels
Irish alternative history novels
Aviation novels
Irish bildungsromans
Steampunk novels
Novels set on islands
Novels set in County Wexford